Ward Vanhoof (born 18 April 1999) is a Belgian racing cyclist, who currently rides for UCI ProTeam .

Major results

2016
 9th Overall Ain Bugey Valromey Tour
1st Young rider classification
2017
 3rd Time trial, National Junior Road Championships
 3rd Overall Driedaagse van Axel
 5th Overall Aubel–Thimister–La Gleize
 7th Ronde van Vlaanderen Juniores
 7th La Philippe Gilbert juniors
 7th Guido Reybrouck Classic
 8th Overall Ain Bugey Valromey Tour
 9th Paris–Roubaix Juniors
 9th Overall Ronde des Vallées
2019
 4th Paris–Roubaix Espoirs
 5th Sundvolden GP
 6th Paris–Tours Espoirs
 7th Internationale Wielertrofee Jong Maar Moedig

References

External links

1999 births
Living people
Belgian male cyclists
People from Mol, Belgium
Cyclists from Antwerp Province
21st-century Belgian people